William Bonython Moffatt (1812 – 24 May 1887) was an architect, who for many years was a partner with Sir George Gilbert Scott at Spring Gardens, London.

Moffatt was the son of a small builder and pupil of James Edmeston. He was originally taken on by Scott to assist with drawings, and then as site architect on four Northamptonshire workhouses.

Moffatt died in 1887 at Summercourt, Cornwall aged 75. He was buried at St Enoder Church, Cornwall.

References

Peter Higginbotham's website on Workhouses
Directory of British Architects 1834–1900, comp. A. Felstead, J. Franklin and L. Pinfield (R.I.B.A., 1993)

1812 births
1887 deaths
19th-century English architects
Gothic Revival architects
Burials in Cornwall